The 2015–16 Boston Celtics season was the 70th season of the franchise in the National Basketball Association (NBA). The Celtics finished the year at 48–34, their best record since their 2011–12 season and their first winning season since 2013.

For the first time in his career, Isaiah Thomas was voted to play in the 2016 NBA All-Star Game. For the second straight season under Brad Stevens, the Celtics qualified for the playoffs, this time as the number 5 seed. However, the Celtics once again did not make it out of the first round as they were stopped by the Atlanta Hawks in six games.

Draft picks

Game log

Preseason game log

|- style="background:#bfb;"
| 1 
| October 6
| @ Milano
| 124–91
| Isaiah Thomas (18)
| David Lee (7)
| Marcus Smart (6)
| Mediolanum Forum11,388
| 1–0
|- style="background:#bfb;"
| 2 
| October 8
| @ Real Madrid
| 111–96
| Avery Bradley (17)
| David Lee (11)
| Jae Crowder (6)
| Barclaycard Center12,414
| 2–0
|- style="background:#bfb;"
| 3 
| October 14
| @ Brooklyn
| 109–105
| Amir Johnson (19)
| Amir Johnson (6)
| Isaiah Thomas (9)
| Barclays Center10,482
| 3–0
|- style="background:#fbb;"
| 4 
| October 16
| @ New York
| 95–101
| Isaiah Thomas (13)
| Jared Sullinger (10)
| Isaiah Thomas (5)
| Madison Square Garden19,421
| 3–1
|- style="background:#bfb;"
| 5 
| October 19
| Brooklyn
| 111–105
| Terry Rozier (16)
| Jerebko, Turner (7)
| Rozier, Turner (6)
| TD Garden15,540
| 4–1
|- style="background:#bfb;"
| 6 
| October 22
| New York
| 99–85
| Jared Sullinger (16)
| Lee, Sullinger (8)
| Marcus Smart (9)
| TD Garden16,101
| 5–1
|- style="background:#bfb;"
| 7 
| October 23
| Philadelphia
| 81–65
| Mickey, Smart (10)
| Jared Sullinger (14)
| Isaiah Thomas (6)
| Verizon Wireless Arena8,403
| 6–1

Standing

Regular season game log

|- bgcolor=#bbffbb
| 1
| October 28
| Philadelphia
| 
| Isaiah Thomas (27)
| Johnson, Sullinger (7)
| Isaiah Thomas (7)
| TD Garden18,624
| 1–0
|- bgcolor=#ffbbbb
| 2
| October 30
| Toronto
| 
| Isaiah Thomas (25)
| Amir Johnson (8)
| Isaiah Thomas (7)
| TD Garden16,898
| 1–1

|- bgcolor=#ffbbbb
| 3
| November 1
| San Antonio
| 
| Avery Bradley (18)
| Lee, Sullinger (8)
| Isaiah Thomas (5)
| TD Garden17,461
| 1–2
|- bgcolor=#ffbbbb
| 4
| November 4
| @ Indiana
| 
| Isaiah Thomas (27)
| Jared Sullinger (11)
| Isaiah Thomas (7)
| Bankers Life Fieldhouse14,022
| 1–3
|- bgcolor=#bbffbb
| 5
| November 6
| Washington
| 
| Jared Sullinger (21)
| Jae Crowder (10)
| Isaiah Thomas (8)
| TD Garden18,624
| 2–3
|- bgcolor=#bbffbb
| 6
| November 10
| @ Milwaukee
| 
| Isaiah Thomas (20)
| Jared Sullinger (10)
| Evan Turner (6)
| BMO Harris Bradley Center18,624
| 3–3
|- bgcolor=#ffbbbb
| 7
| November 11
| Indiana
| 
| Evan Turner (20)
| Jared Sullinger (11)
| Isaiah Thomas (4)
| TD Garden17,879
| 3–4
|- bgcolor=#bbffbb
| 8
| November 13
| Atlanta
| 
| Isaiah Thomas (23)
| Jared Sullinger (10)
| Isaiah Thomas (10)
| TD Garden17,138
| 4–4
|- bgcolor=#bbffbb
| 9
| November 15
| @ Oklahoma City
| 
| Marcus Smart (26)
| Jared Sullinger (15)
| Isaiah Thomas (8)
| Chesapeake Energy Arena18,203
| 5–4
|- bgcolor=#bbffbb
| 10
| November 16
| @ Houston
| 
| Isaiah Thomas (23)
| Marcus Smart (9)
| Isaiah Thomas (6)
| Toyota Center17,005
| 6–4
|- bgcolor=#ffbbbb
| 11
| November 18
| Dallas
| 
| Isaiah Thomas (19)
| Jared Sullinger (12)
| Isaiah Thomas (6)
| TD Garden17,262
| 6–5
|- bgcolor=#bbffbb
| 12
| November 20
| Brooklyn
| 
| Avery Bradley (21)
| Kelly Olynyk (10)
| Isaiah Thomas (9)
| TD Garden18,361
| 7–5
|- bgcolor=#ffbbbb
| 13
| November 22
| @ Brooklyn
| 
| Bradley, Thomas (27)
| Jared Sullinger (10)
| Isaiah Thomas (6)
| Barclays Center14,866
| 7–6
|- bgcolor=#ffbbbb
| 14
| November 24
| @ Atlanta
| 
| Avery Bradley (25)
| Amir Johnson (7)
| Evan Turner (7)
| Philips Arena18,968
| 7–7
|- bgcolor=#bbffbb
| 15
| November 25
| Philadelphia
| 
| Isaiah Thomas (30)
| Jared Sullinger (15)
| Isaiah Thomas (6)
| TD Garden17,588
| 8–7
|- bgcolor=#bbffbb
| 16
| November 27
| Washington
| 
| Isaiah Thomas (21)
| Jared Sullinger (15)
| David Lee (4)
| TD Garden18,624
| 9–7
|- bgcolor=#ffbbbb
| 17
| November 29
| @ Orlando
| 
| Isaiah Thomas (20)
| Jared Sullinger (11)
| Isaiah Thomas (7)
| Amway Center16,209
| 9–8
|- bgcolor=#bbffbb
| 18
| November 30
| @ Miami
| 
| Avery Bradley (25)
| Amir Johnson (10)
| Isaiah Thomas (9)
| American Airlines Arena19,600
| 10–8

|- bgcolor=#bbffbb
| 19
| December 3
| @ Sacramento
| 
| Olynyk, Thomas (21)
| Amir Johnson (7)
| Isaiah Thomas (9)
| Mexico City Arena(Mexico City, MX/NBA Global Games)18,660
| 11–8
|- bgcolor=#ffbbbb
| 20
| December 5
| @ San Antonio
| 
| Isaiah Thomas (23)
| Amir Johnson (11)
| Isaiah Thomas (8)
| AT&T Center18,418
| 11–9
|- bgcolor=#bbffbb
| 21
| December 7
| @ New Orleans
| 
| Isaiah Thomas (22)
| Jared Sullinger (20)
| Isaiah Thomas (5)
| Smoothie King Center15,715
| 12–9
|- bgcolor=#bbffbb
| 22
| December 9
| Chicago
| 
| Isaiah Thomas (23)
| Jared Sullinger (16)
| Evan Turner (7)
| TD Garden17,318
| 13–9
|- bgcolor=#ffbbbb
| 23
| December 11
| Golden State
| 
| Kelly Olynyk (28)
| Jared Sullinger (13)
| Isaiah Thomas (10)
| TD Garden18,624
| 13–10
|- bgcolor=#bbffbb
| 24
| December 12
| @ Charlotte
| 
| Avery Bradley (23)
| Crowder, Sullinger (7)
| Isaiah Thomas (13)
| Time Warner Cable Arena18,490
| 14–10
|- bgcolor=#ffbbbb
| 25
| December 15
| Cleveland
| 
| Avery Bradley (17)
| Evan Turner (8)
| Thomas, Turner (4) 
| TD Garden18,624
| 14–11
|- bgcolor=#ffbbbb
| 26
| December 16
| @ Detroit
| 
| Isaiah Thomas (38)
| Jared Sullinger (10)
| Isaiah Thomas (7)
| The Palace of Auburn Hills13,120
| 14–12
|- bgcolor=ffbbbb
| 27
| December 18
| Atlanta
| 
| Isaiah Thomas (29)
| Jae Crowder (10)
| Isaiah Thomas (6)
| TD Garden18,624
| 14–13
|- bgcolor=bbffbb
| 28
| December 21
| Minnesota
| 
| Kelly Olynyk (19)
| Jae Crowder (10)
| Isaiah Thomas (12)
| TD Garden18,624
| 15–13
|- bgcolor=bbffbb
| 29
| December 23
| @ Charlotte
| 
| Kelly Olynyk (20)
| Jae Crowder (12)
| Isaiah Thomas (7)
| Time Warner Cable Arena19,082
| 16–13
|- bgcolor=bbffbb
| 30
| December 26
| @ Detroit
| 
| Avery Bradley (18)
| Johnson, Sullinger (8)
| Isaiah Thomas (9)
| The Palace of Auburn Hills18,288
| 17–13
|- bgcolor=bbffbb
| 31
| December 27
| New York
| 
| Isaiah Thomas (21)
| Kelly Olynyk (9)
| Isaiah Thomas (6)
| TD Garden18,624
| 18–13
|- bgcolor=ffbbbb
| 32
| December 30
| L.A. Lakers
| 
| Isaiah Thomas (24)
| Jared Sullinger (8)
| Isaiah Thomas (7)
| TD Garden18,624
| 18–14

|- bgcolor=ffbbbb
| 33
| January 2
| Brooklyn
| 
| Isaiah Thomas (24)
| Amir Johnson (11)
| Isaiah Thomas (7)
| TD Garden18,624
| 18–15
|- bgcolor=bbffbb
| 34
| January 4
| @ Brooklyn
| 
| Jae Crowder (25)
| Evan Turner (11)
| Isaiah Thomas (7)
| Barclays Center15,448
| 19–15
|- bgcolor=ffbbbb
| 35
| January 6
| Detroit
| 
| Isaiah Thomas (22)
| Amir Johnson (11)
| Isaiah Thomas (10)
| TD Garden18,624
| 19–16
|- bgcolor=ffbbbb
| 36
| January 7
| @ Chicago
| 
| Jae Crowder (17)
| Jared Sullinger (11)
| Evan Turner (6)
| United Center21,497
| 19–17
|- bgcolor=ffbbbb
| 37
| January 10
| @ Memphis
| 
| Isaiah Thomas (35)
| Amir Johnson (9)
| Isaiah Thomas (8)
| FedEx Forum17,112
| 19–18
|- bgcolor=ffbbbb
| 38
| January 12
| @ New York
| 
| Isaiah Thomas (34)
| Jae Crowder (8)
| Isaiah Thomas (8)
| Madison Square Garden19,812
| 19–19
|- bgcolor=bbffbb
| 39
| January 13
| Indiana
| 
| Isaiah Thomas (28)
| Amir Johnson (18)
| Bradley, Johnson (6)
| TD Garden18,624
| 20–19
|- bgcolor=bbffbb
| 40
| January 15
| Phoenix
| 
| Kelly Olynyk (21)
| Marcus Smart (11)
| Marcus Smart (11)
| TD Garden18,624
| 21–19
|- bgcolor=bbffbb
| 41
| January 16
| @ Washington
| 
| Isaiah Thomas (32)
| Jared Sullinger (9)
| Jae Crowder (6)
| Verizon Center20,356
| 22–19
|- bgcolor=ffbbbb
| 42
| January 18
| @ Dallas
| 
| Smart, Thomas (20)
| Jared Sullinger (11)
| Isaiah Thomas (7)
| AmericanAirlines Center19,866
| 22–20
|- bgcolor=ffbbbb
| 43
| January 20
| @ Toronto
| 
| Isaiah Thomas (21)
| Crowder, Turner (5)
| Isaiah Thomas (10)
| Air Canada Centre19,800
| 22–21
|- bgcolor=bbffbb
| 44
| January 22
| Chicago
| 
| Isaiah Thomas (22)
| Jared Sullinger (12)
| Sullinger, Thomas, Turner (5)
| TD Garden18,624
| 23–21
|- bgcolor=bbffbb
| 45
| January 24
| @ Philadelphia
| 
| Crowder, Thomas (20)
| Amir Johnson (12)
| Jared Sullinger (7)
| Wells Fargo Center9,722
| 24–21
|- bgcolor=bbffbb
| 46
| January 25
| @ Washington
| 
| Isaiah Thomas (23)
| Smart, Sullinger (6)
| Isaiah Thomas (9)
| Verizon Center11,753
| 25–21
|- bgcolor=bbffbb
| 47
| January 27
| Denver
| 
| Avery Bradley (27)
| Amir Johnson (13)
| Johnson, Turner (6)
| TD Garden18,108
| 26–21
|- bgcolor=bbffbb
| 48
| January 29
| Orlando
| 
| Olynyk, Smart (16)
| Jared Sullinger (11)
| Thomas, Turner (8)
| TD Garden17,729
| 27–21
|- bgcolor=ffbbbb
| 49
| January 31
| @ Orlando
| 
| Marcus Smart (26)
| Amir Johnson (11)
| Evan Turner (5)
| Amway Center18,846
| 27–22

|- bgcolor=bbffbb
| 50
| February 2
| @ New York
| 
| Isaiah Thomas (20)
| Turner, Zeller (10)
| Isaiah Thomas (8)
| Madison Square Garden19,812
| 28–22
|- bgcolor=bbffbb
| 51
| February 3
| Detroit
| 
| Isaiah Thomas (17)
| Kelly Olynyk (7)
| Isaiah Thomas (7)
| TD Garden17,297
| 29–22
|- bgcolor=bbffbb
| 52
| February 5
| @ Cleveland
| 
| Isaiah Thomas (22)
| Evan Turner (12)
| Evan Turner (6)
| Quicken Loans Arena20,562
| 30–22
|- bgcolor=bbffbb
| 53
| February 7
| Sacramento
| 
| Avery Bradley (25)
| Amir Johnson (9)
| Thomas, Turner (9)
| TD Garden18,624
| 31–22
|- bgcolor=ffbbbb
| 54
| February 9
| @ Milwaukee
| 
| Bradley, Crowder (18)
| Jared Sullinger (11)
| Evan Turner (10)
| BMO Harris Bradley Center13,215
| 31–23
|- bgcolor=bbffbb
| 55
| February 10
| L.A. Clippers
| 
| Isaiah Thomas (36)
| Jared Sullinger (11)
| Isaiah Thomas (11)
| TD Garden18,186
| 32–23
|- align="center"
| colspan="9" style="background:#bbcaff;" | All-Star Break
|- bgcolor=ffbbbb
| 56
| February 19
| @ Utah
| 
| Isaiah Thomas (25)
| Jared Sullinger (11)
| Isaiah Thomas (6)
| Vivint Smart Home Arena19,911
| 32–24
|- bgcolor=bbffbb
| 57
| February 21
| @ Denver
| 
| Isaiah Thomas (22)
| Jared Sullinger (11)
| Isaiah Thomas (12)
| Pepsi Center16,065
| 33–24
|- bgcolor=ffbbbb
| 58
| February 22
| @ Minnesota
| 
| Jae Crowder (27)
| Jae Crowder (9)
| Isaiah Thomas (9)
| Target Center11,639
| 33–25
|- bgcolor=bbffbb
| 59
| February 25
| Milwaukee
| 
| Isaiah Thomas (27)
| Jared Sullinger (10)
| Isaiah Thomas (7)
| TD Garden18,157
| 34–25
|- bgcolor=bbffbb
| 60
| February 27
| Miami
| 
| Marcus Smart (15)
| Jared Sullinger (12)
| Evan Turner (9)
| TD Garden18,624
| 35–25
|- bgcolor=bbffbb
| 61
| February 29
| Utah
| 
| Jae Crowder (22)
| Johnson, Sullinger (9)
| Isaiah Thomas (9)
| TD Garden17,680
| 36–25

|- bgcolor=bbffbb
| 62
| March 2
| Portland
| 
| Isaiah Thomas (30)
| Smart, Sullinger (11)
| Evan Turner (5)
| TD Garden18,624
| 37–25
|- bgcolor=bbffbb
| 63
| March 4
| New York
| 
| Isaiah Thomas (32)
| Jared Sullinger (11)
| Isaiah Thomas (8)
| TD Garden18,624
| 38–25
|- bgcolor=ffbbbb
| 64
| March 5
| @ Cleveland
| 
| Isaiah Thomas (27)
| Jared Sullinger (13) 
| Avery Bradley (5)
| Quicken Loans Arena20,562
| 38–26
|- bgcolor=bbffbb
| 65
| March 9
| Memphis
| 
| Isaiah Thomas (22)
| Tyler Zeller (7)
| Evan Turner (8)
| TD Garden17,790
| 39–26
|- bgcolor=ffbbbb
| 66
| March 11
| Houston
| 
| Isaiah Thomas (30)
| Jared Sullinger (12)  
| Evan Turner (9)
| TD Garden18,624
| 39–27
|- bgcolor=ffbbbb
| 67
| March 15
| @ Indiana
| 
| Isaiah Thomas (21)
| Jared Sullinger (11)
| Isaiah Thomas (8)
| Bankers Life Fieldhouse17,118
| 39–28
|- bgcolor=ffbbbb
| 68
| March 16
| Oklahoma City
| 
| Isaiah Thomas (29)
| Amir Johnson (12)
| Amir Johnson (5)
| TD Garden18,624
| 39–29
|- bgcolor=ffbbbb
| 69
| March 18
| @ Toronto
| 
| Isaiah Thomas (20)
| Amir Johnson (6)
| Terry Rozier (5)
| Air Canada Centre19,800
| 39–30
|- bgcolor=bbffbb
| 70
| March 20
| @ Philadelphia
| 
| Isaiah Thomas (26)
| Jared Sullinger (13)
| Isaiah Thomas (8) 
| Wells Fargo Center15,103
| 40–30
|- bgcolor=bbffbb
| 71
| March 21
| Orlando
| 
| Isaiah Thomas (28)
| Amir Johnson (11)
| Isaiah Thomas (7)
| TD Garden18,624
| 41–30
|- bgcolor=bbffbb
| 72
| March 23
| Toronto
| 
| Isaiah Thomas (23)
| Amir Johnson (13) 
| Evan Turner (7)
| TD Garden18,624
| 42–30
|- bgcolor=bbffbb
| 73
| March 26
| @ Phoenix
| 
| Isaiah Thomas (28)
| Evan Turner (11)
| Marcus Smart (4)
| Talking Stick Resort Arena18,055
| 43–30
|- bgcolor=ffbbbb
| 74
| March 28
| @ L.A. Clippers
| 
| Isaiah Thomas (24)
| Jared Sullinger (11)
| Marcus Smart (4)
| Staples Center19,258
| 43–31
|- bgcolor=ffbbbb
| 75
| March 31
| @ Portland
| 
| Isaiah Thomas (24)
| Crowder, Sullinger  (10)
| Jared Sullinger (5)
| Moda Center19,393
| 43–32

|- bgcolor=bbffbb
| 76
| April 1
| @ Golden State
| 
| Isaiah Thomas (22)
| Jared Sullinger (12)
| Isaiah Thomas (6)
| Oracle Arena19,596
| 44–32
|- bgcolor=bbffbb
| 77
| April 3
| @ L.A. Lakers
| 
| Isaiah Thomas (26)
| Amir Johnson (13)
| Isaiah Thomas (6)
| Staples Center18,997
| 45–32
|- bgcolor=bbffbb
| 78
| April 6
| New Orleans
| 
| Isaiah Thomas (32)
| Amir Johnson (7)
| Isaiah Thomas (8)
| TD Garden18,624
| 46–32
|- bgcolor=bbffbb
| 79
| April 8
| Milwaukee
| 
| Tyler Zeller (26)
| Jonas Jerebko (7)
| Evan Turner (9)
| TD Garden18,624
| 47–32
|- bgcolor=ffbbbb
| 80
| April 9
| @ Atlanta
| 
| Marcus Smart (19)
| Amir Johnson (8)
| Isaiah Thomas (6)
| Philips Arena19,257
| 47–33
|- bgcolor=ffbbbb
| 81
| April 11
| Charlotte
| 
| Bradley, Thomas (17)
| Kelly Olynyk (11)
| Jared Sullinger (5)
| TD Garden18,624
| 47–34
|- bgcolor=bbffbb
| 82
| April 13
| Miami
| 
| Isaiah Thomas (32)
| Amir Johnson (7)
| Isaiah Thomas (6)
| TD Garden18,624
| 48–34

Roster

Playoffs

Game log

|- style="background:#fbb;"
| 1
| April 16
| @ Atlanta
| 
| Isaiah Thomas (27)
| Jae Crowder (10)
| Isaiah Thomas (8)
| Philips Arena18,980
| 0–1
|- style="background:#fbb;"
| 2
| April 19
| @ Atlanta
| 
| Isaiah Thomas (16)
| Amir Johnson (8)
| Crowder, Smart, Turner (3)
| Philips Arena18,972
| 0–2
|- style="background:#bfb;"
| 3
| April 22
| Atlanta
| 
| Isaiah Thomas (42)
| Jonas Jerebko (12)
| Evan Turner (7)
| TD Garden18,624
| 1–2
|- style="background:#bfb;"
| 4
| April 24
| Atlanta
| 
| Isaiah Thomas (28)
| Jonas Jerebko (10)
| Thomas, Turner (6)
| TD Garden18,624
| 2–2
|- style="background:#fbb;"
| 5
| April 26
| @ Atlanta
| 
| Evan Turner (15)
| Jonas Jerebko (8)
| Terry Rozier (4)
| Philips Arena18,987
| 2–3
|- style="background:#fbb;"
| 6
| April 28
| Atlanta
| 
| Isaiah Thomas (25)
| Smart, Turner (7)
| Isaiah Thomas (10)
| TD Garden18,624
| 2–4

Transactions

Trades

Free agents

Re-signed

Additions

Subtractions

References

Boston Celtics seasons
Boston Celtics
Boston Celtics
Boston Celtics
Celtics
Celtics